Shen Mengyu (born 19 August 2001) is a Chinese footballer who plays as a midfielder for Celtic.

Career

In 2021, Shen signed for Scottish side Celtic, becoming the first Chinese women's player to play in Scotland, helping them win the 2022 Scottish Women's Cup and 2021 Scottish Women's Premier League Cup.

References

External links
 

2001 births
Women's association football midfielders
Celtic F.C. Women players
Chinese expatriate women's footballers
Chinese women's footballers
Chinese Women's Super League players
Expatriate footballers in Scotland
Living people
Scottish Women's Premier League players